53-55 Kent Street, Millers Point are heritage-listed terrace houses located at 53-55 Kent Street, in the inner city Sydney suburb of Millers Point in the City of Sydney local government area of New South Wales, Australia. The property was added to the New South Wales State Heritage Register on 2 April 1999.

History 
Millers Point is one of the earliest areas of European settlement in Australia, and a focus for maritime activities. This sandstone faced terrace was constructed between 1862 and 1865 and has recently been restored to original condition. The fund year for redevelopment was 1993/94.

Description 

One of a pair of mid Victorian face sandstone terraces with top balconies cantilevered over the footpaths. This residence has three bedrooms. Storeys: Two; Construction: Face stone walls, slate roof to main body of roof, corrugated galvanised iron roof to balcony. Cast iron wall brackets, balcony posts, iron lace balustrade. Style: Victorian Georgian.

The external condition of the property is good.

Heritage listing 
As at 23 November 2000, this residence is one of a two large mid Victorian, face sandstone terraces with balconies in mostly intact condition. The cast iron used to bracket the cantilevered balcony and the balustrade was manufactured by J. Bubb's Victoria Foundry.

It is part of the Millers Point Conservation Area, an intact residential and maritime precinct. It contains residential buildings and civic spaces dating from the 1830s and is an important example of 19th century adaptation of the landscape.

53-55 Kent Street, Millers Point was listed on the New South Wales State Heritage Register on 2 April 1999.

See also 

Australian residential architectural styles
49-51 Kent Street

References

Bibliography

Attribution

External links
 

New South Wales State Heritage Register sites located in Millers Point
Terraced houses in Sydney
1865 establishments in Australia
Houses completed in 1865
Articles incorporating text from the New South Wales State Heritage Register
Millers Point Conservation Area